Newtown United Football Club is a Saint Kitts and Nevis football club from East Basseterre.

They currently play in the Saint Kitts and Nevis Premier Division.

History
Newtown United FC were originally called Zip Side Football Team and was formed with Leroy Ponteen and Earl Clarke among the first teams to participate in the Third (3rd) Division. Zip Side secured its first win in its first game and won the Third Division to get promoted to the Second (2nd) Division under that name in 1973 before changing to their current name. The team's name was changed to Newtown United to encourage wider community supporters and a more representative team.
They were then relegated back to the Third Division but regained their Second Division place and were promoted to the top level in 1975 after beating Superstars 2–1 in a playoff.

They have won the domestic championship 15 times.

During the 2015–2016 season, the club stormed to a historic start. As of February 25, 2016, the team had a very comforting lead atop the table of 4 points and were looking unstoppable.

Trophy History
Saint Kitts and Nevis Premier Division: 16
 1981, 1984, 1987, 1988, 1989, 1992, 1993, 1995, 1996, 1997, 1998, 2003–04, 2006–07, 2007–08, 2009–10, 2011–12
Saint Kitts and Nevis National Cup: 2
 2006–07, 2009–10

Performance in CONCACAF competitions
CONCACAF Champions' Cup: 1 appearance
1994 – Third Round – (Caribbean Zone) – Lost against  US Robert 4 – 0 on aggregate (stage 4 of 7)

Current First Team Squad

External links
Unofficial Website
Club profile – SKNFA

 
Football clubs in Saint Kitts and Nevis
1962 establishments in Saint Kitts and Nevis